Streaming television is the digital distribution of television content, such as TV shows, as streaming media delivered over the Internet.  Streaming television stands in contrast to dedicated terrestrial television delivered by over-the-air aerial systems, cable television, and/or satellite television systems.

History 
Up until the 1990s, it was not thought possible that a television programme could be squeezed into the limited telecommunication bandwidth of a copper telephone cable to provide a streaming service of acceptable quality, as the required bandwidth of a digital television signal was around 200Mbit/s, which was 2,000 times greater than the bandwidth of a speech signal over a copper telephone wire.

Streaming services were only made possible as a result of two major technological developments: MPEG (motion-compensated DCT) video compression and asymmetric digital subscriber line (ADSL) data transmission.

The first worldwide live-streaming event was a radio live broadcast of a baseball game between the Seattle Mariners and the New York Yankees streamed by ESPN SportsZone on September 5, 1995. It was the beginning of a new era. During the mid-2000s, the streaming media was based on UDP, whereas the basis of the majority of the Internet was HTTP and content delivery networks (CDNs). In 2007, HTTP-based adaptive streaming was introduced by Move Networks. This new technology would be a significant change for the industry. One year later the introduction of HTTP-based adaptive streaming, many companies such as Microsoft and Netflix developed their streaming technology. In 2009, Apple launched HTTP Live Streaming (HLS), and Adobe, in 2010, HTTP Dynamic Streaming (HDS). In addition, HTTP-based adaptive streaming was chosen for important streaming events such as Roland Garros, Wimbledon, Vancouver and London Olympic Games, and many others and on premium on-demand services (Netflix, Amazon Instant Video, etc.). The increase in streaming services required a new standardization, therefore in 2012, with the contributions of Apple, Netflix, Microsoft, and other companies, Dynamic Adaptive Streaming, known as MPEG-DASH. substituted HTTP. 

The mid-2000s were the beginning of television programs becoming available via the Internet. The video-sharing site YouTube was launched in early 2005, allowing users to share illegally posted television programs. YouTube co-founder Jawed Karim said the inspiration for YouTube first came from Janet Jackson's role in the 2004 Super Bowl incident, when her breast was exposed during her performance, and later from the 2004 Indian Ocean tsunami. Karim could not easily find video clips of either event online, which led to the idea of a video sharing site.

Apple's iTunes service also began offering select television programs and series in 2005, available for download after direct payment. A few years later, television networks and other independent services began creating sites where shows and programs could be streamed online. Amazon Video began in the United States as Amazon Unbox in 2006, but did not launch worldwide until 2016. Netflix, a website originally created for DVD rentals and sales, began providing streaming content in 2007. In 2008 Hulu, owned by NBC and Fox, was launched, followed by tv.com in 2009, owned by CBS. The first generation Apple TV was released in 2007 and in 2008 the first generation Roku streaming device was announced. Digital media players also began to become available to the public during this time. These digital media players have continued to be updated and new generations released.

Smart TVs took over the television market after 2010 and continue to partner with new providers to bring streaming video to even more users. As of 2015, smart TVs are the only type of middle to high-end television being produced. Amazon's version of a digital media player, Amazon Fire TV, was not offered to the public until 2014.

Access to television programming has evolved from computer and television access to include mobile devices such as smartphones and tablet computers. Corresponding apps for mobile devices started to become available via app stores in 2008, but they grew in popularity in the 2010s with the rapid deployment of LTE cellular network. These mobile apps allow users to view provided streaming media on mobile devices which support them.

In 2008, the International Academy of Web Television, headquartered in Los Angeles, formed in order to organize and support television actors, authors, executives, and producers in web series and streaming television. The organization also administers the selection of winners for the Streamy Awards. In 2009, the Los Angeles Web Series Festival was founded. Several other festivals and award shows have been dedicated solely to web content, including the Indie Series Awards and the Vancouver Web Series Festival. In 2013, in response to the shifting of the soap opera All My Children from broadcast to streaming television, a new category for "Fantastic web-only series" in the Daytime Emmy Awards was created. Later that year, Netflix made history by earning the first Primetime Emmy Award nominations for a streaming television series, for Arrested Development, Hemlock Grove, and House of Cards, at the 65th Primetime Emmy Awards. Hulu earned the first Emmy win for Outstanding Drama Series, for The Handmaid's Tale at the 69th Primetime Emmy Awards.

Traditional cable and satellite television providers began to offer services such as Sling TV, owned by Dish Network, which was unveiled in January 2015. DirecTV, another satellite television provider launched their own streaming service, DirecTV Now, in 2016. Sky launched a similar streaming service in the UK called Now TV.

In 2013, streaming video website Netflix earned the first Primetime Emmy Award nominations for original streaming television at the 65th Primetime Emmy Awards. Three of its web series, House of Cards, Arrested Development, and Hemlock Grove, earned nominations that year. On July 13, 2015, cable company Comcast announced an HBO plus broadcast TV package at a price discounted from basic broadband plus basic cable.

In 2017, YouTube launched YouTube TV, a streaming service that allows users to watch live television programs from popular cable or network channels, and record shows to stream anywhere, anytime. As of 2017, 28% of US adults cite streaming services as their main means for watching television, and 61% of those ages 18 to 29 cite it as their main method. As of 2018, Netflix is the world's largest streaming TV network and also the world's largest Internet media and entertainment company with 117 million paid subscribers, and by revenue and market cap.

Technology
The Hybrid Broadcast Broadband TV (HbbTV) consortium of industry companies (such as SES, Humax, Philips, and ANT Software) is currently promoting and establishing an open European standard for hybrid set-top boxes for the reception of broadcast and broadband digital television and multimedia applications with a single-user interface.

BBC iPlayer originally incorporated peer-to-peer streaming, moved towards centralized distribution for their video streaming services.  BBC executive Anthony Rose cited network performance as an important factor in the decision, as well as consumers being unhappy with their own network bandwidth being used for transmitting content to other viewers. Samsung TV has also announced their plans to provide streaming options including 3D Video on Demand through their Explore 3D service.

Access control
Some streaming services incorporate digital rights management.  The W3C made the controversial decision to adopt Encrypted Media Extensions due in large part to motivations to provide copy protection for streaming content. Sky Go has software that is provided by Microsoft to prevent content being copied.

Additionally, BBC iPlayer makes use of a parental control system giving users the option to "lock" content, requiring a password to access it.  The goal of these systems is to enable parents to keep children from viewing sexually themed, violent, or otherwise age-inappropriate material. Flagging systems can be used to warn a user that content may be certified or that it is intended for viewing post-watershed. Honour systems are also used where users are asked for their dates of birth or age to verify if they are able to view certain content.

IPTV

IPTV delivers television content using signals based on the Internet Protocol (IP), through the open, unmanaged Internet with the "last-mile" telecom company acting only as the Internet service provider (ISP). As described above, "Internet television" is "over-the-top technology" (OTT). Both IPTV and OTT use the Internet protocol over a packet-switched network to transmit data, but IPTV operates in a closed system—a dedicated, managed network controlled by the local cable, satellite, telephone, or fiber-optic company. In its simplest form, IPTV simply replaces traditional circuit switched analog or digital television channels with digital channels which happen to use packet-switched transmission. In both the old and new systems, subscribers have set-top boxes or other customer-premises equipment that communicates directly over company-owned or dedicated leased lines with central-office servers. Packets never travel over the public Internet, so the television provider can guarantee enough local bandwidth for each customer's needs.

The Internet protocol is a cheap, standardized way to enable two-way communication and simultaneously provide different data (e.g., TV-show files, email, Web browsing) to different customers. This supports DVR-like features for time shifting television: for example, to catch up on a TV show that was broadcast hours or days ago, or to replay the current TV show from its beginning. It also supports video on demand—browsing a catalog of videos (such as movies or television shows) which might be unrelated to the company's scheduled broadcasts.

IPTV has an ongoing standardization process (for example, at the European Telecommunications Standards Institute).

Streaming quality

Streaming quality is the quality of image and audio transmission from the servers of the distributor to the user's screen. High-definition video (720p+) and later standards require higher bandwidth and faster connection speeds than previous standards, because they carry higher spatial resolution image content. In addition, transmission packet loss and latency caused by network impairments and insufficient bandwidth degrade replay quality. Decoding errors may manifest themselves with video breakup and macro blocks. The generally accepted download rate for streaming high-definition (1080p) video encoded in H.264 is 6000 kbit/s, whereas 4K Ultra HD requires upwards of 16,000 kbit/s.

For users who do not have the bandwidth to stream HD/4K video or even SD video, most streaming platforms make use of an adaptive bitrate stream so that if the user's bandwidth suddenly drops, the platform will lower its streaming bitrate to compensate. Most modern television streaming platforms offer a wide range of both manual and automatic bitrate settings which are based on initial connection tests during the first few seconds of a video loading, and can be changed on the fly. This is valid for both Live and Catch-up content. Additionally, platforms can also offer content in standards such as HDR or Dolby Vision or at higher framerates which can require additional costs or subscription tiers to access.

Usage
Internet television is common in most US households as of the mid-2010s. In a 2013 study by eMarketer, about one in four new televisions being sold is a smart TV. Within the same decade, rapid deployment of LTE cellular network and general availability of smartphones have increased popularity of the streaming services, and the corresponding apps on mobile devices. On August, 18, 2022, Nielsen reported that for the first time, streaming viewership has surpassed cable.

Considering the popularity of smart TVs, smartphones, and devices such as the Roku and Chromecast, much of the US public can watch television via the Internet. Internet-only channels are now established enough to feature some Emmy-nominated shows, such as Netflix's House of Cards. Many networks also distribute their shows the next day to streaming providers such as Hulu Some networks may use a proprietary system, such as the BBC utilizes their iPlayer format. This has resulted in bandwidth demands increasing to the point of causing issues for some networks. It was reported in February 2014 that Verizon is having issues coping with the demand placed on their network infrastructure. Until long-term bandwidth issues are worked out and regulation such at net neutrality Internet Televisions push to HDTV may start to hinder growth.

Aereo was launched in March 2012 in New York City (and subsequently stopped from broadcasting in June 2014). It streamed network TV only to New York customers over the Internet. Broadcasters filed lawsuits against Aereo, because Aereo captured broadcast signals and streamed the content to Aereo's customers without paying broadcasters. In mid-July 2012, a federal judge sided with the Aereo start-up. Aereo planned to expand to every major metropolitan area by the end of 2013. The Supreme Court ruled against Aereo June 24, 2014.

Some have noted that as opposed to broadcast television, with demographics of mostly "unspokenly straight" white viewers, cable, and with streaming services, dollars from subscription can "level the playing field," giving viewers from marginalized communities, and representation of their communities, "equal power."

Market competitors
Many providers of Internet television services exist—including conventional television stations that have taken advantage of the Internet as a way to continue showing television shows after they have been broadcast, often advertised as "on-demand" and "catch-up" services. Today, almost every major broadcaster around the world is operating an Internet television platform. Examples include the BBC, which introduced the BBC iPlayer on 25 June 2008 as an extension to its "RadioPlayer" and already existing streamed video-clip content, and Channel 4 that launched 4oD ("4 on Demand") (now All 4) in November 2006 allowing users to watch recently shown content. Most Internet television services allow users to view content free of charge; however, some content is for a fee.

Since 2012, around 200 over-the-top (OTT) platforms providing streamed and downloadable content have emerged. Investment by Netflix in new original content for its OTT platform reached $13bn in 2018.

Streaming platforms

Netflix 

Netflix, founded by Reed Hastings and Marc Randolph, is a media streaming and video rental in 1997. Two years later, Netflix was offering the audience the possibility of an online subscription service. Subscribers could select movies and TV shows on Netflix's website and receive the chosen titles via DVDs in prepaid return envelopes. In 2007, Netflix's subscribers could watch some movies and TV shows online, directly from their homes. In 2010, Netflix launched an only-streaming plan with unlimited streaming services without DVDs. Starting from the United States, the only-streaming plan reached several countries; by 2016 more than 190 countries could use this service.

Amazon Prime Video 

Amazon Prime Video was launched in 2006 with a different name, Amazon Unbox. Amazon Prime Video is included by Amazon Prime, which is a service that includes free shipping of different types of goods. Amazon Prime Video is available in approximately 200 countries around the world. Amazon each year invests in the production of films and TV series.

Hulu 

Hulu was created in 2007 and opened to the audience one year after its launch. Unlike other streaming platforms, it is only accessible in the United States due to international licensing restrictions. A particular feature of Hulu is that the platform streams TV shows only some days after their broadcast and they are accessible for a limited time. In the beginning, Hulu had a free and paid plan. The free plan was accessible only via computer and there was a limited amount of content for users, whereas the paid plan could be accessible via computers, mobile devices, and connected television, and the number of content was larger than the free plan. In 2019, Walt Disney became the major owner of Hulu.

YouTube 

In 2005, Chad Hurley, Steve Chen, and Jawed Karim bought the YouTube domain name and started to create the website; in May a beta site was launched. The video platform became popular among the audience thanks to a short video, called Lazy Sunday, uploaded by Saturday Night Live in December 2005. The SNL's video was not broadcast on TV, therefore people looked for it on Google by typing "SNL rap video,” “Lazy Sunday SNL,” or “Chronicles of Narnia SNL.” The first result of searches was a link video on YouTube, which was the beginning of sharing videos on YouTube. Because of its popularity, Youtube had some issues caused by its bandwidth expenses. In 2006, Google bought Youtube, and after some months the video platform was the second-largest engine search in the world.

Binge-watching 
In the 90s, the conception and the practice of watching entire seasons in a short amount of time emerged with the introduction of the DVD box. Media marathoning consists in watching at least one season of a TV show in a week or less, watching three or more films from the same series in a week or less, or reading three or more books from the same series in a month or less. The term “binge-watching” arrived with streaming TV, more precisely, when Netflix launched its first original production, House of Cards, and started marketing this process of watching TV series episode after episode in 2013. COVID-19 gave another connotation to binge-watching, which was considered a negative activity. Watching TV shows during the lockdown became something normal and a sort of healing for people.

Broadcasting rights
Broadcasting rights (also called Streaming rights in this case) vary from country to country and even within provinces of countries. These rights govern the distribution of copyrighted content and media and allow the sole distribution of that content at any one time. An example of content only being aired in certain countries is BBC iPlayer. The BBC checks a user's IP address to make sure that only users located in the UK can stream content from the BBC. The BBC only allows free use of their product for users within the UK as those users have paid for a television license that funds part of the BBC. This IP address check is not foolproof as the user may be accessing the BBC website through a VPN or proxy server. Broadcasting rights can also be restricted to allowing a broadcaster rights to distribute that content for a limited time. Channel 4's online service All 4 can only stream shows created in the US by companies such as HBO for thirty days after they are aired on one of the Channel 4 group channels. This is to boost DVD sales for the companies who produce that media.

Some companies pay very large amounts for broadcasting rights with sports and US sitcoms usually fetching the highest price from UK-based broadcasters. A trend among major content producers in North America  is the use of the "TV Everywhere" system. Especially for live content, the TV Everywhere system restricts viewership of a video feed to select Internet service providers, usually cable television companies that pay a retransmission consent or subscription fee to the content producer. This often has the negative effect of making the availability of content dependent upon the provider, with the consumer having little or no choice on whether they receive the product.

Profits and costs
With the advent of broadband Internet connections, multiple streaming providers have come onto the market in the last couple of years. The main providers are Netflix, Hulu and Amazon. Some of these providers such as Hulu advertise and charge a monthly fee. Other such as Netflix and Amazon charge users a monthly fee and have no commercials. Netflix is the largest provider; it currently has over 217 million members. The rise of internet TV has resulted in cable companies losing customers to a new kind of customer called "cord cutters". Cord cutters are consumers who are cancelling their cable TV or satellite TV subscriptions and choosing instead to stream TV shows, movies and other content via the Internet. Cord cutters are forming communities. With the increasing availability of video sharing websites (e.g., YouTube) and streaming services, there is an alternative to cable and satellite television subscriptions. Cord cutters tend to be younger people.

Overview of platforms and availability

See also

 Comparison of streaming media software
 Comparison of video hosting services
 Content delivery network
 Digital television
 Interactive television
 Internet radio
 Internet Protocol television
 Home theater PC
 List of free television software
 List of Internet television providers
 List of streaming media systems
 List of streaming media services
 Livestreamed news
 Multicast
 P2PTV
 Protection of Broadcasts and Broadcasting Organizations Treaty
 Push technology
 Smart TV
 Software as a service
 Television broadcasting
 Video advertising
 Web-to-TV
 Media psychology
 Webcast
 WPIX, Inc. v. ivi, Inc.

References

External links

 IPTV future The Register 2006-05-05
 As Internet TV Aims at Niche Audiences, the Slivercast Is Born New York Times 2006-03-12
 TV's future stars will come from the webThe Guardian 2008-09-11

Digital television
Film and video technology
Internet broadcasting
 
Internet television channels
Streaming media systems
Television technology
Video hosting
Video on demand
New media